Wilfrid Gordon McDonald Partridge is a 1984 children's picture book by Mem Fox. It is about a boy, Wilfrid, who helps an elderly friend, Nancy, to regain some of her memory. In 1998, American company Weston Woods Studio released a film adaptation of this book, narrated by the author with music by Ernest Troost.

Basis 
The name of the boy who is the central character is that of Fox's father, Wilfrid Gordon McDonald Partridge, who, with his wife, Nancy, was sent to Zimbabwe as a teaching missionary.

Reception
School Library Journal wrote: "The illustrations - splashy, slightly hazy watercolors in rosy pastels - contrast the boy's fidgety energy with his friends' slow, careful movements and capture the story's warmth and sentiment". 
Alzheimer's Australia found it "sensitively written". A review by the NYU Langone Medical Center called it "a magnificently written and illustrated story about communication".

Fox herself has noted the politically loaded aspects of the story, in having a white hero, separating the elderly from their families, and having a focus on nuclear families.

References

External links

 Library holdings of Wilfrid Gordon McDonald Partridge

1984 children's books
Australian children's books
Fiction about amnesia
Picture books by Mem Fox
Omnibus Books books